The Eiði Hydroelectric Power Station is the largest hydroelectric power station in the Faroe Islands. It stands below a dam on Lake Eiði (elevation ) on the island of Eysturoy.

The power plant started production on April 28, 1987, and it was built and is owned by the power producer and distributor SEV. Originally, two Francis turbines were installed with a capacity of  each. The plant now has three turbines in operation.

References

Hydroelectric power stations in the Faroe Islands
Buildings and structures completed in 1987
1987 in the Faroe Islands
Buildings and structures in Eiði Municipality